Nicholas Anthony Theodorou  (born June 7, 1975) is a former professional baseball outfielder and infielder. Theodorou played in the Los Angeles Dodgers minor league system from 1998 to 2005.  He participated in the 2004 Olympics, as a member of Greece's baseball team.

Biography
Theodorou was born in Rialto, California, United States and played college baseball at the University of California, Los Angeles. He was drafted by the Los Angeles Dodgers in the 27th round of the 1998 MLB June Amateur Draft.

In 2011, Theodorou played for the Greece's baseball team at the 2011 Baseball World Cup in Panama.

References

External links

The Official Website of UCLA Athletics

1975 births
American people of Greek descent
Baseball players at the 2004 Summer Olympics
Olympic baseball players of Greece
Greek baseball players
Living people
Yakima Bears players
San Bernardino Stampede players
San Antonio Missions players
Vero Beach Dodgers players
Jacksonville Suns players
Las Vegas 51s players
Sportspeople from Rialto, California
Baseball players from California
UCLA Bruins baseball players